Palatinate-Zweibrücken-Vohenstrauss-Parkstein was a state of the Holy Roman Empire based around Vohenstrauß and Parkstein in modern northeastern Bavaria, Germany.

Palatinate-Zweibrücken-Vohenstrauss-Parkstein was created in 1569 out of the partition of the territories of Wolfgang of Palatinate-Zweibrücken for his fourth son Frederick. Frederick died in 1597 without heirs so Vohenstrauss-Parkstein was inherited by Palatinate-Neuburg.

House of Wittelsbach
Counties of the Holy Roman Empire
1569 establishments in the Holy Roman Empire